Duponchel may refer to:

Henri Duponchel (1794–1868, sometimes confused with Charles-Edmond Duponchel), French architect, stage designer, impresario
Philogène Auguste Joseph Duponchel (1774–1846), French soldier and entomologist
Amphonyx duponchel (Duponchel's sphinx), a moth of the family Sphingidae, named after Philogène Auguste Joseph Duponchel
Charles-Edmond Duponchel, French architect, accountant and son of Philogène-Auguste
Auguste Duponchel, chief medical officer of l'Ecole polytechnique and son of Philogène Auguste